Ademir is a Brazilian common given name.

It may refer to these Brazilian footballers:

 Ademir Marques de Menezes (1922–1996), who participated at 1950 FIFA World Cup;
Ademir da Silva Santos Júnior (born 1995), forward
 Ademir da Guia (born 1942), who participated at 1974 FIFA World Cup
Ademir Ribeiro Souza (born 1985), defender who has played in Brazil and Albania
 Ademir Roque Kaefer (born 1960), silver medal winner at the 1984 Summer Olympics.
 Adhemir de Barros, Paraná (born 1942), who participated at 1966 FIFA World Cup

It's also a Bosnian name that can refer to:

 Ademir Kenović (born 1950), Bosnian film director and producer

Brazilian given names
Bosniak masculine given names